Mike Tirico (born December 13, 1966) is an American sportscaster. He is currently the NFL play-by-play announcer on NBC's Sunday Night Football, having replaced Al Michaels in 2022. From 2006 to 2015, Tirico served as a play-by-play announcer on ESPN's Monday Night Football. Tirico has called a multitude of sports in his career, including the NBA, NHL, college football and basketball, golf, tennis, and World Cup soccer.

Tirico left ESPN after 25 years with the network when his contract expired in the summer of 2016, and was subsequently hired by NBC Sports. Tirico debuted during NBC's coverage of the 2016 Open Championship and has since served as the network's lead host for golf coverage.

Since joining NBC Sports, Tirico has become lead primetime host of the Olympics on NBC, was the lead play-by-play for Notre Dame Football on NBC, host of Triple Crown races on NBC, host of NBC's Football Night in America, host of NBC's coverage of the Indianapolis 500 and hosted NBC's coverage of the Stanley Cup.

Early life and education
Tirico was born in New York City to an Italian American mother and African American father. He grew up in the borough of Queens, graduating from Bayside High School. In 1988, he graduated from the S. I. Newhouse School of Public Communications at Syracuse University. At Syracuse, he was the first recipient of the Robert Costas scholarship.

Career

ABC and ESPN (1991–2016)
Tirico joined ESPN in 1991 as a SportsCenter anchor, after four years as Sports Director at CBS affiliate WTVH in Syracuse, New York, during his undergraduate years at Syracuse University. Tirico was noted for his versatile nature and the variety of assignments he handled for SportsCenter. Tirico was the first host seen on ESPNews. Tirico handled the play-by-play for ESPN's Thursday night college football package (1997 to 2005), college basketball coverage (1997 to 2002), NBA coverage (2002 to 2016), and golf coverage for ESPN/ABC (1997 to 2015). Tirico also hosted studio coverage of various ESPN and ABC covered events, including a stint on ESPN's Monday Night Countdown (previously known as NFL Prime Monday) from 1993 to 2001 and ABC's NBA studio shows. He also broadcast NBA games on ESPN/ABC and play-by-play for the NBA Finals on ESPN Radio. He anchored the 2009 U.S. Open (tennis) and co-anchored the 2010 FIFA World Cup, the 2014 FIFA World Cup, and UEFA Euro 2016 (his last assignment at ESPN/ABC).

NBC Sports (2016–present)
On May 9, 2016, after a leak the prior month, it was officially announced that Mike Tirico would join NBC Sports effective July 1, 2016. Tirico signed off for the last time on ESPN on June 30, 2016, during the conclusion of that day's coverage of the UEFA Euro 2016 soccer tournament. Tirico's first on-air appearance on an NBC property came during the 2016 Open Championship on NBC's Golf Channel, calling play-by-play for the first three hours of first and second round coverage. Tirico moved to the studio host role in the afternoons on both Thursday and Friday, and he hosted all on the coverage on NBC proper over the weekend.

Tirico served as a studio host and contributor for NBC's broadcasts of the 2016 Summer Olympics from Rio de Janeiro in August. Richard Deitsch of Sports Illustrated suggested that Tirico could potentially succeed Bob Costas as the primetime host of NBC's Olympics coverage. NBC Sports chairman Mark Lazarus explained following the 2014 Winter Olympics that the division had begun to "think about what life after Bob might be, whether post-Rio, post-Pyeongchang, post-Tokyo, whenever he does not want to do it anymore." Deitsch also felt that Tirico's experience in radio could allow him to contribute to the NBC Sports Radio network.

Sports Business Journal initially reported that Tirico would serve as NBC's lead play-by-play announcer for Thursday Night Football (which was expanding to NBC during the upcoming season), and was likely to be a future successor to Al Michaels. The NFL later stated that its contract with NBC required that the network use its lead play-by-play commentator for all primetime broadcasts. In the meantime, Tirico called the two preseason games allocated to NBC, and was placed on play-by-play for NBC's first three Notre Dame college football games to fill in for Dan Hicks, due to Hicks' conflicts with his lead play-by-play role on NBC's golf coverage, including the 2016 Ryder Cup. Tirico would join Hicks to host Sunday coverage of the event.

Tirico was assigned to two late-season games in the Thursday Night Football package produced for NFL Network, held on a Saturday and Christmas Sunday respectively, with Doug Flutie and Tony Dungy. In November 2016, NBC announced that Tirico would perform play-by-play with Cris Collinsworth on three Sunday Night Football games (including the Thanksgiving primetime game) and one Thursday Night Football game, filling in for Al Michaels. Michaels had requested time off due to NBC's increased NFL workload.

On February 9, 2017, Bob Costas announced that he would be retiring as the primetime host of NBC's coverage of the Olympics, and that Tirico would replace him beginning at the 2018 Winter Olympics. Tirico also replaced Costas as studio host for NBC's NFL coverage and Football Night in America.

On May 31, 2017, it was announced that Mike Tirico would permanently replace Al Michaels as the play-by-play commentator for all of NBC's Thursday Night Football games. In 2017, Tirico took over the role of Tom Hammond in Triple Crown coverage and became full-time as the play-by-play announcer for Notre Dame football in 2017.

Tirico skipped Super Bowl LII in order to focus on preparing for the 2018 Winter Olympics, which began the following Friday. In the 2018 NFL season, after losing Thursday Night Football to Fox, Tirico was assigned to NBC's Thanksgiving game, joined by his Football Night in America colleagues Tony Dungy and Rodney Harrison. He also called two NFL Network Special games in December produced by Fox Sports.

On February 20, 2019, Tirico called his first NHL game on NBCSN's Wednesday Night Hockey, between the Chicago Blackhawks and Detroit Red Wings, joined by Eddie Olczyk on color commentator and Brian Boucher as the "Inside-the-Glass" reporter. Although he has served as studio host for selected NHL broadcasts, this marked his first broadcast as commentator. His performance was well received by viewers and sportswriters. In January of that year, he hosted pregame, intermission, and post-game coverage of the 2019 NHL Winter Classic.

In a similar move to 2016, Tirico filled in for Al Michaels on a few Sunday Night Football games during the 2020 season. Due to the ongoing COVID-19 pandemic, NBC decided to give Michaels 3–5 "bye weeks", in order to minimize travel. One of those weeks was due to Michaels failing to pass NBC's COVID-19 protocols. He also worked one of NBC's two Wild Card games, albeit remotely, also due to COVID-19 protocols. In addition, Tirico had planned to work NBC's Thanksgiving game, but it was postponed to Sunday. Tirico then called the originally planned Sunday night game with Tony Dungy and Kathryn Tappen. Michaels had planned to work the postponed game, but the former game was postponed again to Tuesday, so NBC kept Tirico on duty for the planned Sunday night game, but also placed him back on duty for the game that was later postponed to Wednesday.

Tirico hosted both the 2022 Winter Olympics and the Super Bowl LVI, traveling to Los Angeles part-way through the Games to anchor Olympics coverage from outside SoFi Stadium on the weekend of the Super Bowl.

Broadcasting partners
Tirico has been paired in the college football booth with Tim Brant, Terry Bowden, Mike Gottfried, Kirk Herbstreit, Lee Corso, and David Norrie. Since the beginning of the 2017 season, Tirico has served as play-by-play for Notre Dame Football on NBC, partnering with Doug Flutie and later Tony Dungy. In 2021, Drew Brees joined NBC Sports as Tirico's partner for Notre Dame games and on Football Night in America with Tirico and Dungy. His partners in NBA coverage have included Tom Tolbert, Hubie Brown, and Greg Anthony. His color commentators for golf coverage were Curtis Strange, Ian Baker-Finch, Nick Faldo, and Paul Azinger. He has worked with Len Elmore on college basketball coverage. Tirico worked with Jon Gruden on Monday Night Football and also the Outback Bowl (2011, 2012, 2013 and 2014) and Orange Bowl (2011 and 2012).

On April 21 and 22, 2007, he appeared as a guest host, filling in for Michael Wilbon, alongside Tony Kornheiser on ESPN's Pardon the Interruption.

Tirico currently teams with Cris Collinsworth for Sunday Night Football on NBC.

Radio career
Tirico hosted his first show from WAER radio in Syracuse, the station where he started his sports broadcasting career, on the campus of Syracuse University. Fellow Orange alum Bob Costas was his first guest. On September 20, 2007, Tirico began hosting the short-lived The Mike Tirico Show on ESPN Radio with co-host Scott Van Pelt (later renamed Tirico &Van Pelt in May 2008), replacing Dan Patrick in its previous timeslot. On May 19, 2009, Tirico announced he would be leaving the show to focus more on his television duties; the show would carry on as The Scott Van Pelt Show, with Ryen Russillo becoming the new co-host.

Award
In 2017, Tirico won the Marty Glickman Award for Leadership in Sports Media from the S.I. Newhouse School of Public Communications.

Personal life
Tirico and his wife Debbie, a Michigan native, have two children. The Tiricos have lived in Ann Arbor, Michigan, since 1999.

He has famously stated that he has seen pictures of his father and immediate family, all of whom are of Italian ancestry. "The only contact I had growing up was with my mom’s side of the family. And they are all as white as the refrigerator I’m standing in front of right now." In regard to a genealogical test to see if he has a black ancestor, he said "Yeah. I’d like to find out the truth at some point, so I can answer questions for my kids", but made it clear he does not feel any urgency.

In September 2022, Tirico acknowledged that his father is African-American.

References

External links

 Mike Tirico's ESPN Bio
 Tirico Set to Join Elite Group on 'MNF'

Living people
American horse racing announcers
American people of Italian descent
American sports radio personalities
American television sports announcers
Association football commentators
Bayside High School (Queens) alumni
College basketball announcers in the United States
College football announcers
Golf writers and broadcasters
National Basketball Association broadcasters
National Football League announcers
National Hockey League broadcasters
Notre Dame Fighting Irish football announcers
Olympic Games broadcasters
S.I. Newhouse School of Public Communications alumni
People from Ann Arbor, Michigan
Sportspeople from Queens, New York
Tennis commentators
Motorsport announcers
NBC Sports
1966 births